The men's 4 x 400 metres relay at the 2010 African Championships in Athletics was held between July 31–August 1.

Medalists

 Runners who participated in the heats only and received medals.

Results

Heats
Qualification: First 3 teams of each heat (Q) plus the next 2 fastest (q) qualified for the final.

Final

External links
Results

Relay
Relays at the African Championships in Athletics